This is a list of regencies and cities in Banten province. As of October 2019, there were 4 regencies and 4 cities.

External links 

 
 
Regencies, Indonesia
Regencies and cities